Kit Fan FRSL (born 1979) is an author and poet from Hong Kong who now lives in York in the United Kingdom. In 2011, his poetry book won the Hong Kong University International Poetry Prize. He was elected Fellow of the Royal Society of Literature in 2022.

Biography

Fan was born and raised in Hong Kong and studied at the Chinese University of Hong Kong before moving to the UK at the age of 21. He completed his PhD at the University of York on Thom Gunn.  His first book of poetry, Paper Scissors Stone, published in 2011, won the Hong Kong University International Poetry Prize and his second, As Slow as Possible, released in 2018, was recommended by the Poetry Book Society, the Guardian and the Irish Times.

His first novel, Diamond Hill, was written between 2016 and 2019 and he received a Northern Writers Award for it while in progress in 2018; it was published in May 2021. It was described by the Guardian as 'a thoroughly enjoyable and profound exploration of powerlessness, identity and the evolution of a city'  and by the Wall Street Journal as a 'textured, unsettled portrait of a territory facing a decisive ending'. It is set in the Diamond Hill area of Hong Kong in 1987, when the area - once known for its film studios - was a shanty town. The novel follows the narrator, a former heroin addict nicknamed Buddha  who has been sent to live in a nunnery (based on the Chi Lin Nunnery).

Fan was elected Fellow of the Royal Society of Literature in 2022.

References

1979 births
Living people
Hong Kong writers
Alumni of the Chinese University of Hong Kong
Alumni of the University of York